Greece competed at the 2006 Winter Olympics in Turin, Italy.

Alpine skiing

Biathlon

Cross-country skiing 

Sprint

References

 

Nations at the 2006 Winter Olympics
2006 Winter Olympics
Winter Olympics